is a 1992 Japanese film directed by Hideo Gosha. It was Japan's submission to the 65th Academy Awards for the Academy Award for Best Foreign Language Film, but was not accepted as a nominee.

The story of murder, lust, custom, and violence centers around oil sellers in 18th century Osaka. It is based on a bunraku and kabuki play The Woman-Killer and the Hell of Oil by Chikamatsu Monzaemon. It was released by the Criterion Collection in summer 2013 on their Hulu channel.

Cast
 Kanako Higuchi as Okichi
 Miwako Fujitani
 Shin'ichi Tsutsumi
 Hiroyuki Nagato
 Renji Ishibashi
 Takurô Tatsumi
 Sumie Sasaki

Production
 Yoshinobu Nishioka - Art director

See also
 Cinema of Japan
 List of submissions to the 65th Academy Awards for Best Foreign Language Film
 List of Japanese submissions for the Academy Award for Best Foreign Language Film

Notes

References

External links

1990s Japanese-language films
1992 films
1990s Japanese films